Ruby Ann Barnhill  (born 16 July 2004) is a British actress. She played the lead role of Sophie in Steven Spielberg's Disney live-action film of 2016, The BFG. She subsequently provided the voice of Mary Smith in the English dub of the 2017 film by Studio Ponoc entitled Mary and the Witch's Flower.

Early life
Barnhill was born on 16 July 2004 in Knutsford, Cheshire, England. She lives with her parents and younger sister in Cheshire, and she is a member of the local youth theatre.

Filmography

Film

Television

References

External links
 
Ruby Barnhill biography and filmography

2004 births
Living people
21st-century English actresses
Actresses from Cheshire
English child actresses
English film actresses
English television actresses
People from Knutsford